Mark Shapiro may refer to:

 Mark Shapiro (media executive), American media executive
 Mark Shapiro (sports executive) (born 1967), American baseball executive
 Mark H. Shapiro (born 1940), emeritus professor of physics at California State University, Fullerton

See also
 Marc B. Shapiro (born 1966), professor of Judaic Studies at University of Scranton